Trinculo  is a retrograde irregular satellite of Uranus. It was discovered by a group of astronomers led by Holman, et al. on 13 August 2001, and given the temporary designation S/2001 U 1.

Confirmed as Uranus XXI, it was named after the drunken jester Trinculo in William Shakespeare's play The Tempest. Trinculo is the smallest of Uranus' 27 moons and is approximately only 18 km wide and is roughly the size of Manhattan Island.

See also 

 Uranus' natural satellites

References

External links 
 David C. Jewitt pages
  Uranus' Known Satellites (by Scott S. Sheppard)
 MPC: Natural Satellites Ephemeris Service

Moons of Uranus
Irregular satellites
 
20010813
Moons with a retrograde orbit